Melvyn "Mel" A. Meek (birth unknown – death unknown) was a Welsh rugby union and professional rugby league footballer who played in the 1930s and 1940s, and coached rugby league.

Playing career

International honours
Mel Meek won 14 caps for Wales in 1935–1949 while at Halifax.

Challenge Cup Final appearances
Mel Meek played , and scored a goal in Halifax's 2–9 defeat by Leeds in the 1940–41 Challenge Cup Final during the 1940–41 season at Odsal, Bradford, in front of a crowd of 28,500, and played right-, i.e. number 12, in the 10–15 defeat by Leeds in the 1941–42 Challenge Cup Final during the 1941–42 season on Saturday 6 June 1942.

Coaching career

Club career
Mel Meek was the coach of Huddersfield.

References

Abertillery RFC players
Halifax R.L.F.C. players
Huddersfield Giants coaches
Huddersfield Giants players
Newport RFC players
Place of birth missing
Place of death missing
Rugby league hookers
Rugby league props
Rugby league second-rows
Wales national rugby league team players
Welsh rugby league coaches
Welsh rugby league players
Welsh rugby union players
Year of birth missing
Year of death missing